Alice Christine Stickland (16 March 1906 – 16 April 1987) was an applied mathematician and astrophysics engineer with interests in radar and radiowave propagation.

Early life 
Alice Christine Stickland was born in Camberwell, London on 16 March 1906. Her father was a publisher's clerk.

Education 
Stickland studied mathematics at Kings College, London and graduated with a BSc in 1927. She then went on to study privately while working at the Radio Research Station, Ditton Park. First receiving an MSc in mathematical physics in 1929 and then being awarded a PhD in mathematical physics from University of London in 1943. Her dissertation title was ‘The Propagation of the Magnetic Field of the Electron Magnetic Wave along the Ground and in the Lower Atmosphere’.

Career 
Stickland worked as a scientific civil servant at the Radio Research Station between 1928 - 1947. She worked with radar pioneer, Robert Watson-Watt, on long-wave propagation, Reginald Smith-Rose on short-wave propagation, and Edward Appleton on the properties of the ionosphere.

Stickland, along with Smith-Rose, read a paper entitled 'Ultra-Short Wave Propagation - Comparison Between Theory and Experimental data' at the Institution of Electrical Engineers. The paper described the results of field intensity measurements obtained between 1937-39 using the Post Office radio-telephone link between Guernsey and Chaldon.

She officially retired in 1968 but continued to work as General Editor of the Annals of the International Years of the Quiet Sun (1964-65), and with the International Council for Science’s Committee on Space Research (COSPAR). She was heavily involved in the Girl Guides’ Association.

Selected publications 
Ultra-Short Wave Propagation - Comparison Between Theory and Experimental data - Dr. R. L. Smith-Rose, Miss A. C. Stickland

References 

1906 births
1987 deaths
British mathematicians
Applied mathematicians
British electrical engineers
Alumni of King's College London
British women engineers
People from Camberwell